Shapur-Khwarrah (Middle Persian: Šāhpuhr-Xwarra, meaning "glory of Shapur") was one of the four (later five) administrative divisions of the Sasanian province of Pars. The other administrative divisions were Ardashir-Khwarrah, Istakhr and Darabgerd, while a fifth named Arrajan was founded in the early 6th century by Kavadh I (r. 498–531).

Sources 
 

Subdivisions of the Sasanian Empire
History of Fars Province
Historical geography of Fars